Brainiest may refer to:
 Australia's Brainiest, a television game show series produced in Australia
 Britain's Brainiest Kid, a British television quiz show